The 1992–93 season was the 94th season of competitive league football in the history of English football club Wolverhampton Wanderers. They played the season in the second tier of the English football system, which was now titled Football League First Division after the reorganisation of the leagues following the introduction of the Premier League.

The team remained unbeaten until its thirteenth game, making it their best start to a campaign since 1949–50, but were unable to maintain this level of consistency and ended in 11th place for a second consecutive season.

This season saw the North Bank of Molineux occupied for the first time since the mid-1980s, with the new Stan Cullis Stand being officially opened during pre-season.

Results

Football League First Division

A total of 24 teams competed in the Football League First Division in the 1992–93 season. Each team played every other team twice: once at their stadium, and once at the opposition's. Three points were awarded to teams for each win, one point per draw, and none for defeats. For the first time, teams finishing level on points were firstly divided by the number of goals scored rather than goal difference.

Final table

Source: Statto.com

Results summary

Results by round

FA Cup

League Cup

Anglo-Italian Cup

Wolves played in Group 4 of the preliminary round alongside two other domestic First Division clubs. The winner of the group would advance to the main group stage to play both English and Italian opposition. However, Wolves finished in second place in this initial round and so were eliminated.

Players

|-
|align="left"|||style="background:#faecc8" align="left"|  ‡
|||0||1||0||0||0||0||0||style="background:#98FB98"|||0||0||0||
|-
|align="left"|||align="left"| 
|16||0||1||0||0||0||1||0||style="background:#98FB98"|18||0||0||0||
|-
|align="left"|||align="left"| 
|26||0||0||0||2||0||1||0||29||0||0||0||
|-
|align="left"|||align="left"| 
|28||0||0||0||2||0||2||0||32||0||0||0||
|-
|align="left"|||align="left"|  †
|0||0||0||0||0||0||0||0||0||0||0||0||
|-
|align="left"|||style="background:#faecc8" align="left"|  ‡
|||1||1||0||1||0||0||0||style="background:#98FB98"|||1||0||0||
|-
|align="left"|||style="background:#faecc8" align="left"|  ‡
|||0||2||0||2||0||1||0||style="background:#98FB98"|||0||0||0||
|-
|align="left"|||align="left"| 
|0||0||0||0||0||0||0||0||0||0||0||0||
|-
|align="left"|||align="left"| 
|||0||2||0||1||0||1||0||||0||0||0||
|-
|align="left"|||align="left"| 
|||2||2||0||2||0||2||0||||2||0||0||
|-
|align="left"|||align="left"| 
|||0||0||0||0||0||0||0||style="background:#98FB98"|||0||0||0||
|-
|align="left"|||align="left"| 
|||0||0||0||0||0||1||0||||0||0||0||
|-
|align="left"|||align="left"| 
|12||0||1||0||0||0||0||0||13||0||0||0||
|-
|align="left"|||align="left"|  †
|||0||0||0||0||0||1||0||||0||0||0||
|-
|align="left"|||align="left"| 
|||0||0||0||0||0||0||0||||0||0||0||
|-
|align="left"|||align="left"| 
|||3||||0||2||0||2||1||||4||0||1||
|-
|align="left"|||align="left"| 
|||8||1||0||0||0||||0||||8||0||0||
|-
|align="left"|||align="left"| 
|44||1||2||0||2||1||2||0||50||2||0||0||
|-
|align="left"|||align="left"| 
|||5||1||0||||0||||0||||5||0||0||
|-
|align="left"|||align="left"| 
|||2||2||1||2||0||2||0||||3||0||0||
|-
|align="left"|||align="left"|  ¤
|0||0||0||0||0||0||0||0||0||0||0||0||
|-
|align="left"|||align="left"| 
|||0||2||0||2||0||1||0||||0||0||0||
|-
|align="left"|||align="left"| 
|||0||0||0||0||0||0||0||||0||0||0||
|-
|align="left"|||align="left"| 
|||0||0||0||0||0||0||0||style="background:#98FB98"|||0||0||0||
|-
|align="left"|FW||align="left"| 
|||2||0||0||0||0||0||0||||2||0||0||
|-
|align="left"|FW||align="left"| 
|36||16||2||1||2||1||2||1||42||19||0||0||
|-
|align="left"|FW||align="left"| 
|0||0||0||0||0||0||0||0||0||0||0||0||
|-
|align="left"|FW||align="left"| 
|||9||2||1||2||0||0||0||||10||0||0||
|-
|align="left"|FW||align="left"| 
|||5||0||0||||0||||0||style="background:#98FB98"|||5||0||0||
|-
|align="left"|FW||align="left"|  ¤
|||0||0||0||0||0||1||1||||1||0||0||
|}
Source: Wolverhampton Wanderers: The Complete Record

Transfers

In

Out

Loans in

Loans out

Management and coaching staff

Kit
The season brought two new kits, with the home kit featuring an unpopular gold shirt decorated with black smears that even drew a protest reaction some fans. The away kit was a bright blue shirt with black bands and gold trim on the upper arms. Both were manufactured by the club's own "Molineux" label and sponsored by Goodyear.

References

1992–93
Wolverhampton Wanderers